Bo Lawergren is a Professor Emeritus of physics at Hunter College, The City University of New York. He is also a music archaeologist. He received his PhD in nuclear physics from the Australian National University of Canberra, Australia.

Publications

References

Living people
Hunter College faculty
Year of birth missing (living people)
Asian Cultural Council grantees
Place of birth missing (living people)